Navajeros is a 1980 Spanish-Mexican action drama film, written and directed by Eloy de la Iglesia and starring José Luis Manzano, Isela Vega and Jaime Garza. The plot follows the misadventures of El Jaro, a teen delinquent. It is based on the real life of José Joaquín Sánchez Frutos, aka "El Jaro". The film was a co-production between Spain and Mexico  where  it was released as Dulces navajas. The film was a commercial success in Spain and Mexico.<ref name = "Torres 339">Torres,  Diccionario Espasa Cine Español,  p. 339</ref> It is considered one of the classics of the quinqui film genre.Plot
  
José Manuel Gomez Perales  alias "El Jaro" is a fifteen year old with a long criminal record that includes among other things: 29 escapes from reformatories and three wounds in confrontations with the police. He visits his older brother in jail, but El Jaro spends most of his time with his three best friends: El Butano, Jhonny and El Chus. The four friends form a dangerous gang who steals handbags, coins from public payphones, cars and motorbikes. They also steal what they can from stores breaking the windows. Without a place to stay, El Jaro settles with Mercedes, nicknamed "La Mexicana", a prostitute twenty years older than him. She provides him with love, sex and a home.

At a cemetery, the meeting place for El jaro and his gang, El Jaro surprises his three criminal pals with a gun he managed to acquire. This allows El Jaro and his pals to escalate their criminal activities. They go to an upscale neighborhood of Madrid where they rob a group of gay men gathered in a party. Meanwhile, a journalist, who reports on juvenile delinquency, chronicles the dire circumstances of unemployment and hopeless of the youths in marginals areas of the city and the links between poverty and criminal activities.

While having ice cream, El Jaro is about to be discovered with his gun hidden in his backpack by two undercover policemen, but he is saved by Mercedes who distract the officers. At a disco with his friends, El Jaro meets La Toñi, Chus' sister. Smitten with her, he invites her for a joyride, but Toñi is more interested in the drugs she consumes than in El Jaro.
To find drugs for her, El Jaro goes to El Marques, a drug-dealer who gives him some for sale. El Jaro steals all the drugs, from El marques threatening him with his knife. Back with Mercedes, El Jaro confesses her that he has fallen in love with Toñi, but they continue their affair.

El Jaro and his gang, with Toñi's help, enter a motel and rob all the clients. In one of the rooms, El Jaro discovers his mother, a prostitute, who he has not seen for the last three years since when he ran away at age twelve. Leaving the motel, El Jaro and his gang are pursued by the police but they manage to evade the authorities, fleeing through the roof top to a ballet school in the next building. Lara, a detective, is put in charge by the commissar of police to investigate El Jaro's assault of the motel. They interrogate Jaro's mother.

Looking for drugs in a bar, El Jaro finds El Marques  who takes revenge and has one of his men, Kid Marin, a gay bartender, rape El Jaro. El Butano gathers a large group of teenagers, members of fellow gangs, to avenge what happened to El Jaro. They trash the bar and El Jaro stabs Kid Marin in the ass. The large gathering of juvenile delinquents draws the attention of Lara and the commissar, but El jaro refuses to tell what had happened and he is sent to a reformatory from which he promptly escapes. At the reformatory, a psychologist interviews the four friends: El Jaro, El Butano, the son of Gypsies, Jhonny, the son of a fish salesman and El Chui elmhui who is mostly interested in drugs. The journalist tries to get an interview with El Jaro though the judge in charge of his case, but before he can hear him, El Jaro escapes and he is reunited with Mercedes.

On his next assault, El Jaro and his friends are surprised by the police and while they try to escape El Chus is killed and El Jaro is badly injured in the groin. He awakens in a hospital where Mercedes tells him that he had lost a testicle. After a brief stay in jail, El Jaro is reunited with Mercedes who tells him that Toñi is pregnant. El Jaro wants to have the child but Toñi wants to have an abortion blaming El Jaro for the death of her brother. Mercedes then intercedes with Toñi persuading her to have the baby. Mercedes is truly in love with El Jaro and promises him to take care of him and his soon to be born baby.

Running away with his friends in a stolen vehicle, El Jaro is followed by the police who are tracking four terrorist. In the final confrontation El Jaro and his friends escape while the police and the terrorist kill each other. El Jaro decides to see his mother who is working the streets as a prostitute. His crimes has make him famous in the underworld. Sebas, the local pimp, has a knife fight with El jaro who slashes his face. Jaro's mother goes to help her lover. Toñi, pregnant against her will, grows increasingly bitter. She reproaches El Jaro from living at Mercedes' expense so El Jaro turns to robbery with his friends. At the same time that his son is born, El Jaro is killed from two shots, one to the chest and one to the face.

Cast

Notes

References
Torres, Augusto. Diccionario del cine Español'', Espasa Calpe, 1994,

External links

Films directed by Eloy de la Iglesia
Spanish action drama films
Mexican action drama films
1980s Spanish-language films
1980 action films
1980s Mexican films